The 2019–20 Arminia Bielefeld season was the 115th season in the football club's history. The season covers a period from 1 July 2019 to 28 June 2020. On 16 June, the club was promoted to the 2020–21 Bundesliga, returning to Germany's top tier for the first time since 2008–09.

Background 
The 2018–19 season was Arminia's 4th consecutive season in the 2. Bundesliga, following promotion from the 3. Liga in the 2014–15 season. On 10 December 2018, manager Jeff Saibene was sacked with the club 14th in the 2. Bundesliga. Bielefeld appointed Uwe Neuhaus as their new head coach. He led them to a 7th-placed finish on 49 points.

Season summary 
Bielefeld began the season with a 1–1 draw at St. Pauli, thanks to a 90th minute Manuel Prietl header rescuing a point for Bielefeld. They also drew their second game, a 3–3 draw at home to VfL Bochum, before recording their first win of the season with a 3–1 victory at home to Erzgebirge Aue. Bielefeld picked up 10 points from their next 4 league games before, their unbeaten run was broken with a 1–0 defeat at home to VfB Stuttgart, with a 91st minute Hamadi Al Ghaddioui strike consigning Arminia Bielefeld to their first league defeat of the season. However, Bielefeld bounced back from this defeat with a 1–0 away victory at VfL Osnabrück. Following a draw at home to Hamburger SV, They won their next three league games against Dynamo Dresden, Holstein Kiel and 1. FC Nürnberg to move to the top of the 2. Bundesliga. Though a 1–1 draw at home to SV Sandhausen meant Hamburger SV returned to the top of the table, Bielefeld returned to the top of the league with two goals from Fabian Klos and one from Andreas Voglsammer securing a 3–1 win at SV Darmstadt 98. Arminia Bielefeld entered the winter break top of the 2. Bundesliga on 34 points. During the January transfer window, Bielefeld signed goalkeeper Oscar Linnér from AIK Fotboll and young forward Sebastian Müller from 1. FC Köln, whilst no players left the club.

Following the winter break, Bielefeld beat VfL Bochum 2–0 at home on 28 January 2020, before drawing 0–0 at Erzgebirge Aue on 31 January 2020. Bielefeld scored 10 goals in their following two games, recording a 6–0 win at home to Jahn Regensburg with six different goalscorers, followed by a 4–2 victory away at Greuther Fürth. Bielefeld's next two matches were both 1–0 home victories, first against Hannover 96 and then against Wehen Wiesbaden. Despite going 1–0 down to 2nd placed VfB Stuttgart, a left-footed goal from Cebio Soukou in the 76th minute ensured Bielefeld retain their 6-point league at the top of the 2. Bundesliga. However, the 2. Bundesliga season was postponed later in March due to fears over the COVID-19 pandemic, leaving Bielefeld's chances of promotion in doubt.

After two months without football, it was announced on 7 May 2020 that German football could resume behind closed doors from 16 May 2020, meaning Bielefeld's promotion prospects were strong. Bielefeld returned to action on 17 May 2020, and took the lead against VfL Osnabrück through a 17th minute
Fabian Klos penalty before conceding a 94th-minute equaliser, though still extended their lead over second place to 7 points. Bielefeld's form was inconsistent, with the club winning one and drawing three of their following four matches. A 4–0 win at home to Dynamo Dresden on 15 June 2020 meant that Bielefeld would secure promotion to the Bundesliga if either Hamburger SV or VfB Stuttgart failed to win in their matches on 16 and 17 June respectively. On 16 June 2020, Bielefeld's promotion to the 2020–21 Bundesliga was secured after second-placed Hamburger SV drew 1–1 at home to VfL Osnabrück, rendering it impossible for Bielefeld to finish below second place. Two days later, on 18 June 2020, Bielefeld won the 2. Bundesliga title following a 1–0 win over SV Darmstadt 98. Their final two matches saw a 3–3 draw away at Karlsruher SC followed by a 3–0 victory at home to 1. FC Heidenheim.

First-team squad
As of 31 January 2020

Transfers

Transfers in

Transfers out

Competitions

2. Bundesliga

League table

Results summary

Results by matchday

Matches

DFB-Pokal

Statistics

Appearances and goals

|-
! colspan=14 style=background:#dcdcdc; text-align:center| Goalkeepers

|-
! colspan=14 style=background:#dcdcdc; text-align:center| Defenders

|-
! colspan=14 style=background:#dcdcdc; text-align:center| Midfielders

|-
! colspan=14 style=background:#dcdcdc; text-align:center| Forwards

|-
! colspan=14 style=background:#dcdcdc; text-align:center| Players transferred out during the season

Notes

References

External links

2019-20
German football clubs 2019–20 season